Hans Pontus Farnerud (born 4 June 1980) is a Swedish former professional footballer who played as a midfielder. Starting off his professional career with Landskrona BoIS in the late 1990s, he went on to represent Monaco, Strasbourg, Sporting, and Stabaek before finishing up his career at IFK Göteborg in 2013. He won 11 caps for the Sweden national team between 2002 and 2010 and was a squad player for his country at the 2002 FIFA World Cup and UEFA Euro 2004.

Club career
Farnerud was born in Helsingborg, and grew up in Landskrona. During his youth he was also a promising hockey player, playing with Malmö Redhawks. After starting professionally at 16 with Landskrona BoIS, he was acquired in 1999 by French club AS Monaco FC, and appeared in 15 Ligue 1 matches as the team won the 2000 national title; after spending the 2003–04 season on loan to fellow league side Strasbourg he returned, playing six games in the UEFA Champions League and scoring once in the league, after only one minute on the pitch for a 2–1 home win against FC Nantes.

In June 2005, Farnerud was bought definitely by Strasbourg, reuniting with younger brother Alexander. The pair (with Pontus only missing six league contests) could not prevent a final relegation, as second from the bottom.

Afterwards, Farnerud moved to Sporting CP on a free transfer, being scarcely used during his two-year stint in Portugal. He then returned north to Norway, signing a long-term contract with Stabæk Fotball on 23 July 2008. He helped to a national championship in his debut campaign, eventually being named team captain.

Farnerud spent his two last seasons as a professional back in his homeland, with IFK Göteborg. In late 2013, he retired from the game due to a recurrent hip injury, but returned the following year with amateurs Glumslövs FF (seventh division).

In May 2019, it was announced that Farnerud would take the position as assistant director of football at Göteborg.

International career
Farnerud was a Swedish international from 13 February 2002 to 23 January 2010, making his debut in a 2–2 friendly away draw against Greece where he featured 29 minutes. He was a participant at the 2002 FIFA World Cup and UEFA Euro 2004, but did not leave the bench on either occasion.

Personal life
Farnerud's younger brother, Alexander, is also a footballer. He too is a midfielder and former Swedish international.

After retiring, Farnerud worked as a French League pundit for the TV company C More Entertainment.

Career statistics

International

Honours
Monaco
Ligue 1: 1999–2000
Coupe de la Ligue: 2002–03
Trophée des Champions: 2000

Sporting
Taça de Portugal: 2006–07, 2007–08
Supertaça Cândido de Oliveira: 2007

Stabæk
Tippeligaen: 2008
Superfinalen: 2009

IFK Göteborg
Svenska Cupen: 2012–13

References

External links

1980 births
Living people
Swedish footballers
Association football midfielders
Allsvenskan players
Landskrona BoIS players
IFK Göteborg players
Ligue 1 players
AS Monaco FC players
RC Strasbourg Alsace players
Primeira Liga players
Sporting CP footballers
Eliteserien players
Stabæk Fotball players
Sweden youth international footballers
Sweden under-21 international footballers
Sweden international footballers
2002 FIFA World Cup players
UEFA Euro 2004 players
Swedish expatriate footballers
Expatriate footballers in Monaco
Expatriate footballers in France
Expatriate footballers in Portugal
Expatriate footballers in Norway
Swedish expatriate sportspeople in Monaco
Swedish expatriate sportspeople in France
Swedish expatriate sportspeople in Portugal
Swedish expatriate sportspeople in Norway
Sportspeople from Helsingborg